Fragile Heart may refer to:

"Fragile Heart", a 2000 song by Yolanda Adams
"Fragile Heart", a 2000 song by Westlife
"Fragile Heart" (Jewel song), a 2003 song by Jewel
The Fragile Heart, a 1996 television drama written by Paula Milne